Juan Falconi de Bustamante (1596–1638) was a Spanish religious writer, theologist and ascetic.

Work
Primer to learn to read in Christ ( 1635 )
Primer second reading in Christ ( 1651 )
The Life of God (Letter to a daughter of confession, a private letter, written on 23 July 1628, which was released with the title added by editors in 1656)
The Sacred Monument ( 1657 )
Spiritual Works ( 1660 )
The day our daily bread on communion ( 1661 ) (Considered by some to be his major work)
Preparation of the mass.
Right Way to heaven.
How have to route all actions to God (disappeared).
Defense Commander before the Inquisition of F. Pedro Franco de Guzman.

References 

Spanish male writers
People from the Province of Almería
17th-century Spanish Roman Catholic theologians
1596 births
1638 deaths
University of Salamanca alumni